Tell Agrab (or Aqrab) is a tell or settlement mound  southeast of Eshnunna in the Diyala region of Iraq.

History
Tell Agrab was occupied during the Jemdet Nasr and Early Dynastic periods through the Akkadian and Larsa periods. It was during the Early Dynastic period that monumental building occurred, including
the Shara Temple. There is no evidence that it was occupied after the end of the third millennium BC.

Archaeology
Though it had been subject to illegal digging earlier, the site was officially excavated in 1936 and 1937 by a team from the Oriental Institute of Chicago which was also working at Eshnunna, Khafajah and Tell Ishchali during that time. The dig was led by Seton Lloyd. The primary excavation effort was on the large Early Dynastic temple, which was formerly believed to be dedicated to Shara based on a bowl inscription. However, subsequent research revealed that it belonged to a local deity, Iluma'tim, while the name dLAGABxIGI-gunû from the bowl fragment, formerly read as Shara, might instead be Ishara, which according to Gianni Marchesi and Nicolo Marchetti is more plausible in the light of the distribution of cult centers of these two deities. Only the western end of the temple was studied, the rest being badly eroded. The presence of sling stones and a sappers tunnel indicated an attack in the Early Dynastic era. Aside from a number of treasure caches and cylinder seals found, the most notable find was a copper chariot pulled by four onagers, one of the earliest examples known.

Gallery

See also

 Cities of the ancient Near East

References

Further reading
 
 L., “A Female Clay Figurine from Tell Agrab (Iraq) in the Vatican Museum,” Direzi-one dei Musei Stato della Città del Vaticano, vol.22, pp. 1–11, 2002

External links

Pedestalled Cup from Shara Temple - Oriental Institute
Tell Agrab items possibly lost from Baghdad Museum

Populated places disestablished in the 3rd millennium BC
1936 archaeological discoveries
Agrab
Agrab
Tells (archaeology)
Early Dynastic Period (Mesopotamia)